Ellen Ochoa Prep Academy is a magnet high school in Pico Rivera, California, United States. It is a part of the El Rancho Unified School District. Ochoa Prep provides a college preparatory curriculum.

The school opened in 2016 and stands on the former Selby Grove Elementary lot.

References

External links
Official website

High schools in Los Angeles County, California
Magnet schools in California